Endocladia is a genus of red algae belonging to the family Endocladiaceae.

The species of this genus are found in Northern America.

Species:

Endocladia muricata 
Endocladia vagans 
Endocladia vernicata 
Endocladia viridis

References

Gigartinales
Red algae genera